A Unix-like (sometimes referred to as UN*X or *nix) operating system is one that behaves in a manner similar to a Unix system, although not necessarily conforming to or being certified to any version of the Single UNIX Specification.  A Unix-like application is one that behaves like the corresponding Unix command or shell. Although there are general philosophies for Unix design, there is no technical standard defining the term, and opinions can differ about the degree to which a particular operating system or application is Unix-like.

Some well-known examples of Unix-like operating systems include Linux and BSD. These systems are often used on servers, as well as on personal computers and other devices. Many popular applications, such as the Apache web server and the Bash shell, are also designed to be used on Unix-like systems.

One of the key features of Unix-like systems is their ability to support multiple users and processes simultaneously. This allows users to run multiple programs at the same time, and to share resources such as memory and disk space. This is in contrast to many older operating systems, which were designed to only support a single user or process at a time. Another important feature of Unix-like systems is their modularity. This means that the operating system is made up of many small, interchangeable components that can be added or removed as needed. This makes it easy to customize the operating system to suit the needs of different users or environments.

Definition 
The Open Group owns the UNIX trademark and administers the Single UNIX Specification, with the "UNIX" name being used as a certification mark.  They do not approve of the construction "Unix-like", and consider it a misuse of their trademark.  Their guidelines require "UNIX" to be presented in uppercase or otherwise distinguished from the surrounding text, strongly encourage using it as a branding adjective for a generic word such as "system", and discourage its use in hyphenated phrases.

Other parties frequently treat "Unix" as a genericized trademark. Some add a wildcard character to the name to make an abbreviation like  "Un*x" or "*nix", since Unix-like systems often have Unix-like names such as AIX, A/UX, HP-UX, IRIX, Linux, Minix, Ultrix, Xenix, and XNU. These patterns do not literally match many system names, but are still generally recognized to refer to any UNIX system, descendant, or work-alike, even those with completely dissimilar names such as Darwin/macOS, illumos/Solaris or FreeBSD.

In 2007, Wayne R. Gray sued to dispute the status of UNIX as a trademark, but lost his case, and lost again on appeal, with the court upholding the trademark and its ownership.

History 

"Unix-like" systems started to appear in the late 1970s and early 1980s. Many proprietary versions, such as Idris (1978), UNOS (1982), Coherent (1983), and UniFlex (1985), aimed to provide businesses with the functionality available to academic users of UNIX.

When AT&T allowed relatively inexpensive commercial binary sub-licensing of UNIX in 1979, a variety of proprietary systems were developed based on it, including AIX, HP-UX, IRIX, SunOS, Tru64, Ultrix, and Xenix. These largely displaced the proprietary clones.  Growing incompatibility among these systems led to the creation of interoperability standards, including POSIX and the Single UNIX Specification.

Various free, low-cost, and unrestricted substitutes for UNIX emerged in the 1980s and 1990s, including 4.4BSD, Linux, and Minix. Some of these have in turn been the basis for commercial "Unix-like" systems, such as BSD/OS and macOS. Several versions of (Mac) OS X/macOS running on Intel-based Mac computers have been certified under the Single UNIX Specification. The BSD variants are descendants of UNIX developed by the University of California at Berkeley with UNIX source code from Bell Labs. However, the BSD code base has evolved since then, replacing all of the AT&T code. Since the BSD variants are not certified as compliant with the Single UNIX Specification, they are referred to as "UNIX-like" rather than "UNIX".

Categories 
Dennis Ritchie, one of the original creators of Unix, expressed his opinion that Unix-like systems such as Linux are de facto Unix systems. Eric S. Raymond and Rob Landley have suggested that there are three kinds of Unix-like systems:

Genetic UNIX 
Those systems with a historical connection to the AT&T codebase. Most commercial UNIX systems fall into this category. So do the BSD systems, which are descendants of work done at the University of California, Berkeley in the late 1970s and early 1980s. Some of these systems have no original AT&T code but can still trace their ancestry to AT&T designs.

Trademark or branded UNIX 
These systemslargely commercial in naturehave been determined by the Open Group to meet the Single UNIX Specification and are allowed to carry the UNIX name. Most such systems are commercial derivatives of the System V code base in one form or another, although Apple macOS 10.5 and later is a BSD variant that has been certified, EulerOS and Inspur K-UX are Linux distributions that have been certified, and a few other systems (such as IBM z/OS) earned the trademark through a POSIX compatibility layer and are not otherwise inherently Unix systems.  Many ancient UNIX systems no longer meet this definition.

Functional UNIX 
Broadly, any Unix-like system that behaves in a manner roughly consistent with the UNIX specification, including having a "program which manages your login and command line sessions"; more specifically, this can refer to systems such as Linux or Minix that behave similarly to a UNIX system but have no genetic or trademark connection to the AT&T code base. Most free/open-source implementations of the UNIX design, whether genetic UNIX or not, fall into the restricted definition of this third category due to the expense of obtaining Open Group certification, which costs thousands of dollars.

Around 2001, Linux was given the opportunity to get a certification including free help from the POSIX chair Andrew Josey for the symbolic price of one dollar. There have been some activities to make Linux POSIX-compliant, with Josey having prepared a list of differences between the POSIX standard and the Linux Standard Base specification, but in August 2005, this project was shut down because of missing interest at the LSB work group.

Compatibility layers
Some non-Unix-like operating systems provide a Unix-like compatibility layer, with varying degrees of Unix-like functionality.
 IBM z/OS's UNIX System Services is sufficiently complete as to be certified as trademark UNIX.
 Cygwin, MSYS, and MSYS2 each provide a GNU environment on top of the Microsoft Windows user API, sufficient for most common open source software to be compiled and run.
 The MKS Toolkit and UWIN are comprehensive interoperability tools which allow the porting of Unix programs to Windows.
 Windows NT-type systems have a POSIX environmental subsystem.
 Subsystem for Unix-based Applications (previously Interix) provides Unix-like functionality as a Windows NT subsystem (discontinued).
 Windows Subsystem for Linux provides a Linux-compatible kernel interface developed by Microsoft and containing no Linux code, with Ubuntu user-mode binaries running on top of it.
 Windows Subsystem for Linux version 2 (WSL2) provides a fully functional Linux environment running in a virtual machine.

Other means of Windows-Unix interoperability include:
 The above Windows packages can be used with various X servers for Windows
 Hummingbird Connectivity provides several ways for Windows machines to connect to Unix and Linux machines, from terminal emulators to X clients and servers, and others
 The Windows Resource Kits for versions of Windows NT include a Bourne Shell, some command-line tools, and a version of Perl
 Hamilton C shell is a version of csh written specifically for Windows.

See also 

 List of Unix-like systems
 Berkeley Software Distribution
 Linux kernel and Linux distribution
 List of Linux distributions
 List of Unix commands
 List of operating systems
 Free Software Foundation and GNU Project

References

External links 
 Unix-like Definition, by The Linux Information Project (LINFO)
 UNIX history a history time line graph of most UNIX and Unix-like systems by Éric Lévénez
 

Unix
 
Operating system families